Zapološko is a former village in North Macedonia.

References

Villages in Prilep Municipality
Former villages